Newtown, Eliogarty (Ballymurreen) is a townland in the Barony of Eliogarty in County Tipperary, Ireland. It is in the civil parish of Ballymurreen.

It is one of 19 townlands known as Newtown (Irish: An Baile Nua) in County Tipperary.

References

Townlands of County Tipperary